Kilifi County  was formed in 2010 as a result of a merger of Kilifi District and Malindi District, Kenya. Its capital is Kilifi and its largest town is Malindi. Kilifi county is one of the five counties that make up the Kenyan Coast.

The county is located north and northeast of Mombasa. Kilifi has fewer tourists than Mombasa County, however there is some tourism in Kikambala, Watamu, Malindi and Kilifi. The county is known for the Ruins of Gedi, which includes mosques and tombs dating from the 11th to the 17th century.

Tourism
Tourism and fishing in Kilifi County are the major economic activities due to its proximity to the Indian Ocean. The major tourist attractions in Kilifi County are the Ruins of Gedi, Watamu Marine National Park, the Malindi Museum, the Rabai Museum, Matungu Beach, and the Kaya forest. It also contains the Mnarani ruins that date back to between the 14th and 17th century.

Economy 
The county has a strong industrial sector with the Mabati Rolling Mill and the Athi River Cement Factory contributing heavily to the region's economy in employment provision and income generation.

Agriculture 
Opportunities exist in agriculture, particularly dairy and crop farming thanks to fertile soil and good weather. The county had a successful cashew nut milling industry. Maize and cassava are the main subsistence crops and the main cash crops grown in the county include coconuts, cashew nuts, sisal and citrus fruits such as mangoes and pineapples .

Demographics
Kilifi county has a total population of 1,453,787, of which 704,089 are males, 749,673 are females and 25 are intersex persons. There are 298,472 households, with 4.4 persons per household on average, and a population density of 116 people per square kilometer. The major communities living in Kilifi County include Mijikenda, Swahili, Bajuni, Indians, Arabs and Europeans.

Religion 
Kilifi County has a Christian majority, with 68% of residents professing Christianity. 18% of residents are Muslim and 10% are atheist.

Administrative divisions

Kilifi county has 7 sub-counties and 35 county assembly wards.

Constituencies 
The county has 7 Constituencies: 

Bahari Constituency, which was formed in 1988, was disbanded in 2013 and superseded by two new constituencies, Kilifi North Constituency and Kilifi South Constituency.

Politics 
Gideon Mung'aro is the current governor of Kilifi County, having served since August 2022.Stewart Madzayo has represented Kilifi County in the Senate since 2017. Gertrude Mbeyu Mwanyanje is the woman representative elected in 2017.

Source

Education 

Kilifi County has 1071 ECD centres, 757 primary schools, 178 secondary schools, 13 youth polytechnics, and 280 adult education centres.

Health 
There are a total of 235 health facilities in the county with one county referral hospital.

Transport and Communication 
The county is covered by a network of 3,678.6 km of roads. Of this, 2,230.9 km is surfaced by earth, 1,091.5 km is surfaced by murram and 356.2 km is covered by bitumen.

The county's main highways are Mombasa Malindi highway and Kaloleni Mavueni.

There are 7 post offices, with 6,800 installed letter boxes, 6,120 rented letter boxes and 680 vacant letter boxes.

Image gallery

Villages and settlements

Banda Ra Salama
Bibitoli
Bukatwavi
Bara Hoyo
Belewa
Buji Albati
Chonyi
Dakacha
Dakawachu
Dindiri
Dulukiza
Dzitsuhe
Fundi Isa
Jarabuni
Luswani
Malindi
Ushingo
Vipingo
Waresa
Watamu
Ganda
Kwaupanga
Girigi
Pendukiani
Mere
Mshongoleni

See also 

 Mombasa County
Kwale County
Tana River County
Lamu County
Taita-Taveta County

References

External links
Districts of Kenya
CIA World Fact Book on Kenya
http://www.mambolook.com/kilifi

 
Counties of Kenya